MacGeorge or Macgeorge is a surname. McGeorge are a branch of the MacFheorais family which moved from Ireland to Galloway, and which in itself was part of the De Birmingham family. Notable people with the surname include:

Ebenezer Farie Macgeorge (born ca.1827), surveyor and astronomer in Victoria, Australia, son of R. F. Macgeorge
James Macgeorge, architect in South Australia, son of R. F. Macgeorge
Jim MacGeorge (born 9 October 1928), American voice actor.
Norman Macgeorge (1872–1952), artist and critic in Victoria, Australia, grandson of R. F. Macgeorge
Robert MacGeorge, Anglican priest in Scotland in the 19th century
Robert Forsyth Macgeorge, Scottish tailor and businessman in South Australia
William Stewart MacGeorge (1861–1931), a Scottish artist

See also
McGeorge a similar surname